Thakilu Kottampuram is a 1981 Indian Malayalam-language film written and directed by Balu Kiriyath based on the story Venalil Vidarunna Pookkal by S. Thankappan, who also produced the film. It stars Prem Nazir, Sheela, Mohanlal and Jagathy Sreekumar in substantial roles. The film features songs composed by Darsan Raman and P. Susheeladevi, while the background score was provided by Guna Singh.

Cast

Prem Nazir as Rajakrishna Kurup
Sheela as Mridula
Mohanlal as Paul
Jagathy Sreekumar as Shishupalan
Adoor Bhasi as Kunjunni Kurup
Sukumaran as Unnikrsihna Kurup
Anjali Naidu as Uma
Baby Manjusha as Sreemol
Jalaja as Padmaja
Mala Aravindan as Vasu
 Gusth Sreekumar
 Jayaprakash
Santhakumari as Mridula's mother
Sathyachithra 
Praveena as Urmila
Sreekala (Rathidevi) as Theresiakutty
 Daisy

Soundtrack
The music was composed by Darsan Raman and P Susheeladevi and lyrics was written by Balu Kiriyath.

Release and reception

References

External links
 

1981 films
1980s Malayalam-language films